The Fall of Math is the debut album by the instrumental post-rock band 65daysofstatic, released on September 20, 2004, through Monotreme. It contains what is arguably their most famous track, "Retreat! Retreat!".

The album spawned two singles, both released after the album. While "Retreat! Retreat!" was a standard CD single release featuring two b-sides, "Hole" was released as a 7-track EP with a length of almost thirty minutes. Both tracks were accompanied by promotional videos.

The song "Aren't We All Running?" appeared in the initial trailer for the video game Binary Domain.

Track listing

References

2004 debut albums
65daysofstatic albums